Laughton Osborn (1809-1878) was an American poet and playwright.  He used the alias Charles Erskine White, D.D. He was born in New York City and graduated from Columbia College in 1827.

Bibliography
Sixty Years of Life (1831)
Confessions of a Poet (1835)
Vision of Rubeta (1838)
Arthur Carryl (1841)
The Silver Head, the Double Deceit: Comedies (1867)
Calvary—Virginia: Tragedies (1867)
Alice, or the Painter's Story (1867)
Bianca Capello: A Tragedy (1868)
Travels by Sea and Land (1868)
Ugo Da Este—Uberto—The Cid of Seville: Tragedies (1869)
The Magnetiser, the Prodigal: Comedies in Prose (1869)
Meleagros, the New Cavalry: Tragedies (1871)

References

External links
  The Literati of New York

1809 births
1878 deaths
American poets
American dramatists and playwrights
Poets from New York (state)
19th-century poets